Rosalie Boissonneault (born 4 July 2003) is a Canadian artistic swimmer. In 2020, Boissonneault joined the national senior team in 2020.

Career
In May 2021, Boissonneault finished in eighth place at in the solo event at a virtual World Cup stop. In June 2021, Boissonneault was named to the Canadian Olympic team. At the age of 17, she was the youngest person named to the team.

References 

Living people
2003 births
Canadian synchronized swimmers
Sportspeople from Drummondville
Synchronized swimmers at the 2020 Summer Olympics
Olympic synchronized swimmers of Canada
21st-century Canadian women